Nabyendu Chatterjee (1937 – 14 January 2009) was an Indian Bengali and Hindi film director and producer. In 1991 he received 38th National Award for the Best Feature Film in Bengali.

Career
Chatterjee started his career as an actor in 1962 but soon turned into direction. He worked with Bengali director Aravind Mukherjee as an assistant. He made his directorial debut with an experimental Hindi film Naya Rasta in 1967. In his career he was known as independent, off beat film maker with un parallel and art films. His choice of literary stories to be translated into film scripts by himself. In 1981 Chatterjee made Sarisreep base on Manik Bandopadhyay's story. His last finished work Mansur Miyar Ghora attracted positive criticism soon after release. Chatterjee could not complete his last film, Sanskar, a project he pursued for years. He died at the age of 71 after a massive heart attack in his North Kolkata residence in 2009.

Filmography
 Naya Raasta (1967)
 Adwitiya (1968)
 Chitthi (1972)
 Ranur Pratham Bhag (1972)
 Aaj Kal Parshur Galpo (1981)
 Chopper (1987)
 Sarisreep (1987)
 Parshuramer Kuthar (1989)
 Atmaja (1990)
 Shilpi (1994)
 Dusri Kahani (1998)
 Mansur Miyar Ghora (2001)
 Sanskar

References

External links
 

1937 births
2009 deaths
Bengali film directors
Hindi-language film directors
Indian documentary filmmakers
20th-century Indian film directors
Film directors from Kolkata
21st-century Indian film directors
Directors who won the Best Feature Film National Film Award